Sergeant Maurice Albert Wyndham Rogers, VC, MM (17 July 1919 – 3 June 1944) was a British Army soldier of the Second World War and a recipient of the Victoria Cross, the highest award for gallantry in the face of the enemy that can be awarded to British and Commonwealth forces.

Details
Rogers was 24 years old, and a sergeant in the 2nd Battalion, Wiltshire Regiment (Duke of Edinburgh's), British Army, during the Battle of Anzio when the following deed took place, at Ardea, for which he was awarded the Victoria Cross.

The citation in the London Gazette of 8 August 1944, gives the following details:

Legacy

In 2003 Rogers had a road named after him. A new industrial estate had been built at Hopton, Devizes, Wiltshire (near to the old Le Marchant Barracks) and the road has been called "Sgt Rogers Way". The road sign gives his full name and location and year of the VC award.

In 1947 a new housing estate, comprising two large low rise blocks of flats, in Bethnal Green east London was named 'Rogers Estate' after him. One of the blocks has a bronze plaque attached to the exterior at ground floor level commemorating this. Rogers parents were in attendance at the opening ceremony.

His story was published as the cover story for D.C. Thomson's Victor comic in issue 204 dated 16 January 1965.

His Victoria Cross is displayed at The Rifles (Berkshire and Wiltshire) Museum in Salisbury, Wiltshire.

References

External links

 
 

1919 births
1944 deaths
Military personnel from Bristol
Wiltshire Regiment soldiers
Recipients of the Military Medal
British Army personnel killed in World War II
British World War II recipients of the Victoria Cross
British Army recipients of the Victoria Cross